Basnæs is a manor house and estate located southeast of Skælskør, Slagelse Municipality, Denmark. The Gothic Revival style main building is a three-storey building with three corner towers designed by Gustav Friedrich Hetsch. The estate covers approximately 1,000 h4ectares of land.

History
The early history of the estate is unclear but the two small villages of  Basnes and Nybølle were in the 14th century located at the site where Basnæs stands today. In 1366, Niels Pedersen pledged two farms in Basnes and two farms in Nybølle to Thure Knudsen.

In 1400, the farms were acquired by the Busjios of Roskilde. In 1410 they were owned by abbot Matz in Næstved. In 1417, the farms in Nybølle were acquired by Jakobsen Lunge. Basnæs is first mentioned in 1426. After Jakobsen Lunge's death in 1428, Basnæs passed to his brother Ove Jakobsen Lunge. In 1451, he was succeeded by his son Thyge Lunge.

Tyge Lunge's son-in-law, Jesper Krafse, inherited Basnæs in 1460. The estate then remained in the hands if the Krafse family for the next one hundred and fifty years. Margrethe Hansdatter Krafse, who had inherited the estate in 1602, was later married to Otto Brahe. They had no children and after their deaths Basnæs was therefore, in 1614, passed to her husband's sisters, Birgtte and Helvig Brahe. Helvig Brahe's share of the estate was in  1623 ceded to Henrik Wisch and shortly thereafter to Christian IV.

In circa 1626, Basnæs was acquired by Axel Arenfeldt, who had already acquired the other share of the estate. The buildings had by then fallen unto neglect and Arenfeldt therefore began the construction of a new main building. He also increased the size of the estate to one of the largest on Zealand. After his death in 1647, Basnæs passed to his sons, Jakob and Jørgen Arenfeldt, and by 1676 it had passed to their relative Anna Ramel. In 1681, it was ceded to her brother, Ove Ramel. who once again increased the size of the estate through the acquisition of more land. Ove Ramel's widow, Mette Rosenkrantz, sold Basnæs in 1685.

The new owner of Basnæs was Christian Bielke. Bielke omcreased the size of the estate even further and improved its management. His third wife, Vibeke Juel, who had become a widow in 1694, married Gregers Juel in 1701. He sold the estate in 1705. The new owner was Poul Eggers. In 1716, Basnæs was sold in public auction and the estate then changed hands 1q6 times over the next one hundred years. Stamhuset Basnæs was, however, already dissolved in 1783.

In 1809, Basnæs was acquired by Frederik Fiedler. His widow, Juliane Marie Sporon, kept the estate until her death in 1837.

In 1838, Basnæs was acquired by Jacob Brønnum Scavenius. His wife, Henriette, was the daughter of count Otto Joakim Moltke of nearby [[Espe (manor house)
|Espe Manor]]. The writer Hans Christian Andersen aften visited the family at Basnæs. He visited Basnæsapprozimately 37 times in the period 1855-1872, spending approximately 15 months on the estate. Henriette Scavenius kept the estate after her husband's death. Their son, Otto Jacob Brønnum Scavenius, constructed a new main building.

In 1907, Basnæs was acquired by count Eiler Moltke. In 1933, he sold the estate to De Forenede Cichorietørrerier A/S.  In 1952, it was converted into an independent company, Basnæs A/S.

Architecture
The Gothic Revival style main building is a three-storey building with three corner towers designed by Gustav Friedrich Hetsch.

List of owners
 ( -1366) Niels Pedersen 
 (1366- ) Thure Knudsen 
 (1400-1410) Biskop Peder Jensen Lodehat i Roskilde 
 (1410- ) Abbed Metz i Næstved 
 (1417) Biskop Jens i Roskilde 
 ( - ) Anders Jakobsen Lunge 
 ( -1451) Ove Jakobsen Lunge 
 (1451-1460) Thyge Ovesen Lunge 
 (1460-1504) Jesper Krafse 
 (1504-1530) Hans Jespersen Krafse 
 (1530-1566) Jesper Hansen Krafse 
 (1566- ) Kirstine Bølle, gift Krafse 
 ( -1599) Eiler Jespersen Krafse 
 (1599-1602) Hilleborg Bølle, gift Krafse 
 (1602-1603) Margrethe Hansdatter Krafse, gift Brahe 
 (1603-1614) Otto Brahe 
 (1614-1625) Birgitte Brahe 
 (1614-1623) Helvig Brahe 
 (1623- ) Henrik von d. Wisch 
 ( -1625) Kronen 
 (1625-1647) Axel Arenfeldt 
 (1647-1676) Jacob Axelsen Arenfeldt 
 (1647-1676) Jørgen Axelsen Arenfeldt 
 (1676-1681) Anna Ramel, gift Reedtz 
 (1681-1685) Ove Ramel 
 (1685-1694) Christian Bielke 
 (1694-1701) Vibeke Nielsdatter Juel, gift 1) Bielke, 2) Juel 
 (1701-1705) Gregers Juel 
 (1705-1716) Poul Eggers 
 (1716) Lars Benzon 
 (1716-1728) Laurence de Boysset
 (1728-1736) Christian Frederik de Boysset 
 (1736-1749) Frederik Conrad von Holstein 
 (1749-1751) Boet efter Frederik Conrad von Holstein 
 (1751) Johan Baltzer Höserich 
 (1751-1757) Peder Mikkelsen Qvistgaard 
 (1757-1763) Frederik Otto von Wedel-Jarlsberg 
 (1763-1764) Frederik Auguste Adolphe de Favin 
 (1764-1765) Niels de Hofman 
 (1765-1766) Peter Johansen Neergaard 
 (1766-1768) Johan Thomas Petersen de Neergaard 
 (1768-1778) Mathias Brønstorph 
 (1778-1783) Jens Lowson 
 (1783-1791) Charlotte Amalie Riis, gift Lowson 
 (1783-1805) Christian L. Schütz 
 (1805-1806) Frederik von Blücher 
 (1806-1809) Helene de Thygeson, gift Blücher 
 (1809-1829) Christian Frederik Fiedler 
 (1829-1837) Juliane Marie Sporons, gift Fiedler 
 (1837-1838) Boet efter Juliane Marie Sporons, gift Fiedler 
 (1838-1850) Jacob Brønnum Scavenius 
 (1850-1898) Henriette Moltke, gift Scavenius 
 (1898-1907) Otto Jacob Brønnum Scavenius 
 (1907-1933) Eiler Moltke 
 (1933-1952) De Forenede Cichorietørrerier A/S 
 (1952–present)Basnæs A/S

References

External links

 Source
 Source
 Source
 Source

Manor houses in Slagelse Municipality
Buildings and structures associated with the Scavenius family